Georg Braun (22 February 1907 – 22 September 1963) was an Austrian footballer and coach.

Club career
Born and raised in Vienna, in the vicinity of the Prater, Braun played 10 years for local side Wiener AC, with whom he reached the 1931 Mitropa Cup Final, which they lost to city rivals First Vienna. He once won the league title with WAC.

International career
Nicknamed Schurl, Braun was part of Austria national football team at the 1934 FIFA World Cup. He earned 13 caps, scoring one goal.

Honours
Austrian Cup (1):
 1931

External links

References

 

1907 births
1963 deaths
Footballers from Vienna
Austrian footballers
Austria international footballers
1934 FIFA World Cup players
Stade Rennais F.C. players
LASK players
FC Admira Wacker Mödling players
Ligue 1 players
Ligue 2 players
Austrian expatriate footballers
Expatriate footballers in France
Austrian football managers
LASK managers
FC Linz managers
Association football forwards

pt:Georg Braun